CCMS may refer to:

Institutions
 Center for Coastal Marine Sciences at California Polytechnic State University, San Luis Obispo, California
 Center for Computational Mass Spectrometry, a proteomics center at the University of California, San Diego
 Claremont Center for the Mathematical Sciences at the Claremont Colleges, Claremont, California
 Council for Catholic Maintained Schools in Northern Ireland
 NATO Committee on the Challenges of Modern Society (NATO/CCMS)

Schools

 Cane Creek Middle School in Fletcher, NC
 Centennial Campus Middle School in Raleigh, NC
 Cornwall Central Middle School in Cornwall, NY
 Culver City Middle School in Culver City, CA
 Curtis Corner Middle School in Wakefield, RI
 Charles Carroll Middle School in New Carrollton, Maryland
 Country Club Middle School in Miami, Florida
 Cincinnati College of Mortuary Science in Cincinnati, Ohio

Technologies
 California Court Case Management System, the court case management system used by the judiciary of California
 Central Case Management System, an open source software for paralegal organisations
 Child Care Management System in Australia
 Component Content Management System
 Content and community Management System
 SAP Computing Center Management System, a system monitoring and alerting system for SAP software
 Client and Cost Management System, used by the Legal Aid Agency to manage legal aid costs